Cyperus meyenianus, commonly known as Meyen's flatsedge, is a species of sedge that is native to tropical areas of South America.

The species was first formally described by the botanist Carl Sigismund Kunth in 1837.

See also
List of Cyperus species

References

meyenianus
Plants described in 1837
Taxa named by Carl Sigismund Kunth
Flora of Argentina
Flora of Mexico
Flora of Bolivia
Flora of Paraguay
Flora of Ecuador
Flora of Brazil
Flora of Peru
Flora of Venezuela
Flora of Uruguay